OK Budućnost Podgorica, also known by the sponsorship name of Budućnost Podgorička banka, is a volleyball club from Podgorica, Montenegro.

It is considered the most successful volleyball club from Montenegro. It plays its home games at Morača Sports Center.

The team participates in the Men's CEV Champions League 2007-08.

OK Budućnost is a part of Budućnost Podgorica sports society.

Previous names 
....-Present : Budućnost Podgorička Banka

Squad 
 Dušan Medojević
 Ivan Bošković
 Marko Vukašinović
 Luka Babić
 Andrej Bojić
 Nikola Kažić
 Bojan Đukić
 Slobodan Bojić
 Marko Đuranović
 Ivan Rašović
 Boris Vlahović
 Bojan Radović
 Petar Gošović

Notable former players
 Milan Đurić
 Miloš Ćulafić
 Marko Bojić
 Aleksandar Milivojević

Montenegrin volleyball clubs
Budućnost Podgorica